Komadul (also Romanized as Komādūl; also known as Kamādel) is a village in Sardar-e Jangal Rural District, Sardar-e Jangal District, Fuman County, Gilan Province, Iran. At the 2006 census, its population was 205, in 59 families.

References 

Populated places in Fuman County